Dorchester Rugby Football Club is an English amateur rugby union club that is based in Dorchester, Dorset, England.  The club currently play in Southern Counties South - a tier 7 league in the English rugby union system - following their promotion from Dorset & Wilts 1 South at the end of the 2019-20 season. Their home ground is Coburg Road, built on land leased from the Duchy of Cornwall. The club was first formed in 1871.

Club Honours

1st Team
Dorset & Wilts 1 South champions (3): 1990-91, 2017-18, 2019-20
Southern Counties champions: 1994-95
South West 2 East champions: 1998-99 
Dorset & Wilts Cup winners: 1999-00
Dorset & Wilts Senior Vase winners: 2017, 2020

2nd XV
Dorset & Wilts Cup winners: 1995-96
Dorset & Wilts Cup 2nd XV Cup
Dorset & Wilts 1 South champions: 2008-09
Dorset & Wilts 3 South champions: 2011-12
Dorset & Wilts 2 South champions: 2018-19

3rd XV
 Dorset & Wilts 4 champions: 2014-15
 Dorset & Wilts South Matrix champions: 2019-20

Statistics
 Most games played for 1st XV                — Frank Dike 658
 Most Games played for Dorchester            — Frank Dike 969
 Most Tries scored for 1st XV                — Tony Foot  138
 
1st XV biggest win vs. Ventnor, Isle of Wight, 4 October 1997:  99 – 7.

Notes

References

External links
 |Dorchester RFC official website

1871 establishments in England
Rugby clubs established in 1871
English rugby union teams
Sport in Dorchester, Dorset
Organisations based in Dorset
Rugby union in Dorset